This is a list of seasons played by Chirk AAA FC from the 1877–78 season, when the club began playing in competitive fixtures following the founding of the Welsh Cup, to the most recent current season.

The club was formed in 1876 and is one of the oldest clubs in Wales. The club is a founder member of the Football Association of Wales and remains a member to the present day. Chirk are nicknamed the Colliers, as their early teams were composed of miners from the two local collieries.

Seasons

Key

Honours

References 

Football clubs in Wales
Sport in Wrexham County Borough
Football clubs in Wrexham